"Forget to Remember" is a song by American heavy metal band Mudvayne and the third single from their 2005 album Lost and Found. The song was featured in the film Saw II, which helped gain the band considerable mainstream popularity. It was also featured on 2006's MTV2 Headbanger Ball CD. There is an acoustic version of the song on By the People, for the People.

Music video
In September 2005, the band met with film director Darren Lynn Bousman, whose film Saw II was in production and would feature this single. Bousman showed them a scene depicting a man cutting his own eye out of his skull to retrieve a key. Gray told Bousman about the conversation at Bob's Big Boy two years earlier, and Bousman revealed that he holds his production meetings at the restaurant, and that Saw II had been based on a screenplay Bousman wrote years earlier. Gray appeared in a small role in the film, and Bousman directed the music video for "Forget to Remember", which featured clips from the film and performance footage shot on one of the film's sets.

Charts

References

External links
 Music video

2005 singles
2005 songs
Mudvayne songs
Songs written by Chad Gray
Songs written by Ryan Martinie
Songs written by Matthew McDonough
Songs written by Greg Tribbett
Epic Records singles